The J.C. Stemmer House is a historic building located in Elkader, Iowa, United States.  This two-story brick structure was built in 1889 in the Victorian style.   Its elaborate and extensive woodwork is its primary feature.  While it is primarily capped with a hip roof the wings feature gable ends that allow for bargeboards and stone decoration.  A single story wrap-around wooden porch with latticework covers the main facade and follows to the south.  The house also features stained glass windows above the main entrance and at various other locations.  It was listed on the National Register of Historic Places in 1976.

References

Houses completed in 1889
Victorian architecture in Iowa
Houses in Elkader, Iowa
National Register of Historic Places in Clayton County, Iowa
Houses on the National Register of Historic Places in Iowa